John Francklyn (c. 1564 – 1645) was an English politician who sat in the House of Commons from 1640 to 1644.

Francklyn was of Wiltshire. He matriculated at Magdalen Hall, Oxford on 18 May 1582, aged 18.

In November 1640, Francklyn was elected Member of Parliament for Marlborough in the Long Parliament. He sat until his death in 1645.

References

1560s births
1645 deaths
English MPs 1640–1648
Alumni of Magdalen Hall, Oxford
Year of birth uncertain
People from Wiltshire